Mark James Morriss (born 18 October 1971) is an English singer and songwriter, best known as the frontman for The Bluetones. He is the older brother of bandmate and bass player/illustrator Scott Morriss. He has released four solo albums, worked with Matt Berry's band The Maypoles and sung lead vocals on The Helicopter of the Holy Ghost project. When not touring with the Bluetones, he regularly plays solo acoustic shows across the UK.

Biography

Mark Morriss released his debut solo album, Memory Muscle in May 2008. A folk-tinged record, it featured five re-recorded tracks which had previously been released under the name "Fi-Lo Beddow" as a self-released EP in February 2006. The strings on the record were arranged by film composer David Arnold, who became a fan of Expecting to Fly whilst scoring Independence Day.

In 2014, Morriss released his second solo album A Flash of Darkness via Acid Jazz Records. This was followed by another Acid Jazz release in 2015, The Taste of Mark Morriss, an album of cover versions. Morriss has also recorded the theme music for all of the children's audiobooks written by David Walliams. Morriss is also currently a full member of Matt Berry's live band, The Maypoles, and regularly tours the UK with this outfit as a rhythm guitarist and backing vocalist.

In 2021, Morriss appeared as the vocalist for Billy Reeves' The Helicopter of the Holy Ghost project, on the album Afters. Morriss joined former theaudience member Reeves on the album, which was co-produced by Richard Archer of Hard-Fi, with the album also featuring members of Cocteau Twins, Engineers and Gazpacho.

Personal life
 
In November 2021, allegations of emotional and physical abuse against Morriss were made by his ex-wife, Anna Wharton. Morriss disputed the claims, telling The Guardian: "I may have been thoughtless and selfish in some of the dealings in my personal life of late, but these allegations of abuse and gaslighting are wholly untrue, and I refute [sic] them completely.”  Following these allegations, Morriss was dropped from The Big Britpop Family Party in London.

On 2 March 2022, Morriss issued a statement in response to his ex wife's allegations.

Solo discography

EPs
 2006 - The Fi-Lo Beddow EP

Singles
 2008 - "I'm Sick"
 2008 - "Lay Low" (download-only)
 2014 - "This Is The Lie (And That's The Truth)"
 2014 - "Space Cadet"
 2015 - "Lucretia (My Reflection)"
 2019 - "All The Wrong People"
 2019 - "The Beans"

Albums
 2008 - Memory Muscle
 2014 - A Flash of Darkness (originally a Pledge campaign album, but reissued through the Acid Jazz label)
 2015 - The Taste of Mark Morriss
 2017 - Look Up (originally a Pledge campaign album, but reissued on vinyl in 2019 through the Reckless Yes label)

References

External links
 Official website

1971 births
Living people
English songwriters
English male singers
People from Hounslow
The Bluetones members
Britpop musicians
21st-century English singers
21st-century British male singers
British male songwriters
Acid Jazz Records artists